The 2010–11 Austrian Hockey League was a season of the Austrian Hockey League (known as Erste Bank Eishockey Liga (or EBEL league) for sponsorship reasons). The 2010-11 season ended with an exciting victory in game 7 of the championship finals for the EC Red Bull Salzburg team.

Teams

Regular season

Standings

Individual statistics

Scoring leaders 
The following players led the league in points at the conclusion of the regular season.

Leading goaltenders 
The following goaltenders led the league in goals against average at the end of the regular season.

Playoffs
The EC Red Bull Salzburg team won the season, after beating the EC KAC 4-3 in the final series. Game 7 ended with an exciting overtime goal by the Red Bulls, giving them the league championship for the second year in a row, with a final game score of 3-2.

After the regular season, the standard of 8 teams qualified for the playoffs. In the playoff games the better placed team at the end of the regular season will have the right to play at home first. In the quarterfinals the 1st ranked team will play against the 8th ranked team, 2nd vs 7th, 3rd vs 6th, 4th vs 5th - each in a best-of-seven series.

In the semifinals the four winners of the quarterfinals will play as follows: the best ranked club (in the regular season) of the four semifinalists will play against the worst ranked club, the second best ranked club against the second worst ranked club - each in a best-of-seven series. The two winners of the semifinals will play a best-of-seven series in the final round.

If a playoff game is undecided at the end of the regular time after a 17 minutes break a 20-minute "Sudden Victory Overtime" will be played. Should the game still be undecided after the first overtime period after another 17 minutes break a second 20-minute "Sudden Victory Overtime" will be played and so on until the deciding goal is scored. Each team may only use four skaters; however, at least three skaters must be used.

External links

References

Austrian Hockey League seasons
Aus
1
Aus
2010–11 in Hungarian ice hockey
2010–11 in Croatian ice hockey